Firoj Mahmud Hossain (born 15 January 1974), known as Firoz Mahmud Titu, is a Bangladeshi former footballer who played as a full-back.

He played for the Bangladesh national team from 1999 to 2007. He is famous for his goal against FR Yugoslavia during the 2001 Sahara Cup becoming the first and only Bangladeshi player to score against a European team to date.

Club career
Titu started playing professionally through Fakirerpool Young Men's Club during the 1994–95 seasons after being admitted into BKSP in 1991. He also played for Dhaka Abahani, Mohammedan Dhaka, Brothers Union, Dhanmondi Club and Arambagh KS and won the league title with 3 different clubs.  He spent the last 7 years of his career with Muktijoddha Sangsad KC where he was the club captain.

Controversies
After not receiving payment from Muktijoddha Sangsad KC even though he was contracted with the club, Titu and a number of players criticized the club officials, stating that the club's officials misappropriated their money and they should be punished.

International career
Titu represented and captained Bangladesh at U16, U19, U20 and U23 level. On 21 November 1999, Titu made his debut for Bangladesh against Uzbekistan. He scored twice during his time with the national team, his goals came against Pakistan during the 2007 AFC Asian Cup qualifiers and against FR Yugoslavia in the 2001 Sahara Cup. He was also part of the 2003 SAFF Championship winning Bangladesh team.

International goals
Scores and results list Bangladesh's goal tally first.

Bangladesh U23

Bangladesh

Honours
Bangladesh
 SAFF Championship: 2003

References 

1974 births
Living people
Footballers from Dhaka
Bangladeshi footballers
Association football fullbacks
Muktijoddha Sangsad KC players
Mohammedan SC (Dhaka) players
Brothers Union players
Abahani Limited (Dhaka) players
Arambagh KS players
Bangladesh Football Premier League players
Bangladesh youth international footballers
Bangladesh international footballers